Château de Chabannes was an orphanage in the village of Chabannes (part of today's Saint-Pierre-de-Fursac) in Vichy France where about 400 Jewish refugee children were saved from the Holocaust by efforts of its director, Félix Chevrier and other teachers. It was operated by Œuvre de secours aux enfants (OSE) from 1940 to 1943.

It is the subject of a 1999 documentary, The Children of Chabannes, by filmmakers Lisa Gossels (whose father and uncle were among the survivors) and Dean Wetherell.

References

External links
Château de Chabannes. Photo Archives United States Holocaust Memorial Museum
A Miracle Happened There: A Review of "The Children of Chabannes" by Gentry Menzel (newenglandfilm)
The Children of Chabannes - review Los Angeles Times, 23 November 2000
Chabannes & Le Chambon Open Letter from Pierre Sauvage to Lisa Gossels, producer of the 2000 documentary The Children of Chabannes
The official page made by the french department where Chabannes is located (in French)
the Children's Home in Château de Chabannes, at Yad Vashem website

Châteaux in Creuse
Chateau De Chabannes
Chateau De Chabannes